North East Mall (previously as Northeast Mall) is an American super-regional shopping mall located in Hurst, Texas, United States, a suburb in the Dallas/Fort Worth metroplex. It is located below highways SH 121, SH 183, and is east of Interstate Highway 820 S. It features two units, the main mall and the outside being the Shops at North East Mall both encompassing a total of 2,134,000 square feet (198,000 m²) and featuring 135 stores. This mall currently maintains the traditional retailers Macy's, Dillard's, Dick's Sporting Goods, and Penney's while featuring the premier specialty retailers Chico's, Earthbound Trading Co., Fossil, Hollister, Michael Kors, Offline by Aerie, Windsor and White House Black Market.

History

1970–1998: Beginnings
The center originated with a Leonard's department store, the Fort Worth-based chain's third location. This store was dedicated July 10, 1970. A single level mall of eighty inline stores was added, which officially opened March 25, 1971. This included a Fort Worth-based Stripling's (inaugurated March 18, 1971) and JCPenney (which commenced operation November 3, 1971). North East Mall now encompassed 750,000 leasable square feet. Sears and Montgomery Ward stores were added, which opened in August 1978. This expansion also added twenty store spaces and the United Artists Cinema 6, along with Panda Express.

A further expansion ensued in 1990 when the mall gained a food court, created from the former location of Service Merchandise.

The mall office is located near Sears.

1999–2004: Expansion and power center

In October 1999, a $200 million renovation and expansion of North East Mall succeeded. Plans to open a  Power center adjacent to the Mall known as The Shops at North East Mall came to fruition, it officially opened in October 1999. The Shops at North East Mall opened in October 1999.

At the same time in 1999, the first parking structure were both completed. Four parking garages were also constructed as part of the 1998–2001 remodeling. A new South Wing was built, containing 28 store spaces.

In the fall of 2000, Saks Fifth Avenue opened as the first and only store in Tarrant County inside a 100,000 sq ft space at the mall.

When North East Mall held its official re-dedication on September 15, 2001, the center encompassed 1,749,000 leasable square feet and 168 stores and services. It was then the second-largest enclosed shopping mall in the Dallas–Fort Worth metroplex and the second-largest in Texas, following The Galleria in Houston.

2005–present

In September 2006, it was announced that Saks Fifth Avenue would be shuttering this location as part of a restructuring.

A BJ's Brewhouse opened outside the mall in 2009.

On January 23, 2014, Dallas Morning News reported that new additions were coming to North East Mall, which were expected to open in spring 2014. On January 27, 2014, KTVT reported that the construction on State Highway 183 was decreasing the population of the mall, as well the sales.

On June 30, 2014, it was reported by the Fort Worth Business Press that according to Simon, new additions were coming to the mall.

On November 1, 2019, a major scale refurbishment of the JCPenney store would be completed. The store would have its lighting fixtures, departments and internal embellishments replaced.

Around the beginning of the early 2020's saw several storied traditional department store retailers update its brick-and-mortar divisions after being disrupted by several digital retailers in recent years.

On August 6, 2019, it was announced that Sears will shutter as part of an ongoing effort to phase out of its traditional brick-and-mortar divisions.

On May 7, 2020, Nordstrom, which maintains several additional outposts close by, also announced plans to shutter along with several additional locations around this country as a direct result of pulling back because of the COVID-19 crisis, causing it to focus on its remainder highest achieving locations.

Several additional replacement tenants for each space are each reportedly in the midst of early on discussions.

See also
 Galleria Dallas
 Grapevine Mills
 North Hills Mall (North Richland Hills)
 List of shopping malls in Texas

References

External links
 

Shopping malls in the Dallas–Fort Worth metroplex
Buildings and structures in Tarrant County, Texas
Tourist attractions in Tarrant County, Texas
Simon Property Group
Shopping malls established in 1971
1971 establishments in Texas